The Criterion for Religions, the English rendering of Mi‘yarul Madhahib, was written and published in 1895 by Mirza Ghulam Ahmad, founder of the Ahmadiyya Muslim Community. This English edition was published in 2007, by Islam International Publications

Description 
Ahmad believed that Islam was a living faith and the only faith by which man could establish contact with his Creator and enter into communion with him. According to Ahmad, the teachings in the Quran and Sharia were designed to raise man to moral, intellectual and spiritual perfection. 

Comparing Islam with other religions, Ahmad writes: "Islam's understanding of God is very simple and clear, and is in keeping with human nature. Even if the books of all other religions were to disappear along with all of their teachings and concepts, God, towards Whom the Holy Quran leads, would still be clearly reflected in the mirror of the laws of nature, and His Might and Wisdom, shall be found glowing in every particle." (page 30)

Why deify a man

Ahmad asks, how could the British Government, consisting of people so enlightened subscribe to a religion,

"that deifies a man and thus detracts from the self-evident, eternal and immutable glory of the true God?... Nevertheless, I am hopeful that He will guide this courageous Government towards the right path. Our prayer for this Government is as much for its worldly prosperity as for the hereafter. No wonder therefore if we do witness the effect of this prayer.(p-6)

Means for the discovery of truth

Ahmad claims that modern education has replaced the old simple religious thinking with a complex philosophic mode. However, certain factors in the modern days have made the discovery of "Truth" even easier. First and foremost is the freedom to preach and move around in these days. He writes:

Major faiths

Ahmad observes India has three major religious faiths. The Araya Hindus, the Christians and the Muslims. He claims none is ready to accept that his faith is not based on the true principles.

The hallmark of a true religion
Ahmad writes:

"The hallmark of a true religion is that even before we advance arguments in its favour, it is, in its very essence, so bright and resplendent that against it all other religions appear to be enveloped in darkness." 

Ahmad writes the teachings contained in the Quran were in strict accord with instinctive human requirements and it took them to a higher plank of sublimity and spiritualism. . Ahmad says,'Islam is strictly in accord with human nature and appeals to mankind'.

Differentiate true from false religion

The author believes, a true religion can be differentiated from a false one, by its approach to the "recognition of God". He writes:
"the religion which possesses the intrinsic light of truth, and which has the ability to draw hearts towards itself purely because of its manner of Divine recognition." (p. 6)

He compares the three major religions with regard to this criterion.

God in the Arya and Christian Religions

Ahmad critically examines:

The booklet consisting of 38 pages, critically examines the major religions and their principles briefly..

See also
 Writings of Mirza Ghulam Ahmad

References

Works by Mirza Ghulam Ahmad
Urdu-language books
Islamic theology books
1895 non-fiction books
19th-century Indian books
Indian religious texts